HMS Walrus (S08) was the last of the Porpoise class submarines of the Royal Navy. She was launched on 22 September 1959, and commissioned on 10 February 1961.

Royal Navy Service
On one occasion during exercises with  an error resulted in a practice torpedo becoming embedded in the submarine's casing.

Following an 18-month refit at Devonport Dockyard she commissioned for the third time on 3 December 1969.  In 1970 she was present at Portsmouth Navy Days  Walrus also attended the 1977 Silver Jubilee Fleet Review off Spithead when she was part of the Submarine Flotilla.

She was sold in 1987 to the Seaforth Group to be refitted for resale to Egypt, but was broken up at Grimsby in 1991.

Notable commanding officers
Notable commanding officers include Lieutenant Commander John Fieldhouse (1961–1962) and Lieutenant Commander Roger Lane-Nott (1974–1976).

References

Publications
 

 

British Porpoise-class submarines
Ships built on the River Clyde
1959 ships